Pok Shau-fu (21 June 1909 – 4 November 2000) was a Chinese-born journalist and politician. He served in the Legislative Yuan from 1981 to 1987. He was a native of Jiangsu.

Career
In the 1960s, Pok was the publisher of Newsdom, a magazine based in Hong Kong. He also served as a correspondent to the United Daily News. In 1968, Pok was awarded a Chia Hsin Award for journalism for reporting on the riots of the previous year. He was appointed to the Legislative Yuan as a representative of Hong Kong and Macau for the first time in 1980, and reappointed in 1983.

Shortly after the death of his wife in 1996, Pok was diagnosed with lung cancer. He and Liang Su-yung eulogized publisher  at Liu's funeral, held in Taipei in February 2000. Pok fell ill later that year and first sought treatment in France, and was later admitted to Ruttonjee Hospital in Hong Kong. On 3 November 2000, Pok removed himself from medical equipment and refused to eat or drink. He fell into a coma at 10:00 the next morning, and died soon after.

References

1909 births
2000 deaths
Republic of China journalists
Taiwanese people from Jiangsu
Republic of China politicians from Jiangsu
Kuomintang Members of the Legislative Yuan in Taiwan
Members of the 1st Legislative Yuan in Taiwan